Jackie Appiah (born 5 December 1983) is a Canadian-born Ghanaian actress. For her work as an actress, she has received several awards and nominations, including the awards for Best Actress in a Leading Role at the 2010 Africa Movie Academy Awards; and Best Actress in a Supporting Role at the Africa Movie Academy Awards in 2007. She received two nominations for Best Actress in a Leading Role and Best Upcoming Actress at the Africa Movie Academy Awards in 2008.

Early life
Jackie Appiah was born on December 5, 1983, in Toronto, Canada. She is the last of five children. She is a Ghanaian Canadian, as she was born in Toronto. She spent her early childhood in Canada, and moved to Ghana with her mother at the age of 10. She is popularly known by her maiden name, Appiah. Appiah married Peter Agyemang in 2005 and has one son. Appiah's father is Kwabena Appiah (the younger brother of the late Joe Appiah, a famous lawyer in Kumasi), currently residing in Toronto, Ontario, Canada.

Controversy 
It was rumoured in 2020 that Jackie Appiah got pregnant for the Liberian president, George Weah. However, she dismissed the rumour by taking to her Instagram page saying: "Laughter that dispels lies and fabricated stories."

Career 
Appiah's appearance on screen became regular when she was invited by Edward Seddoh Junior, the writer of Things We Do For Love, where she played the role of Enyonam Blagogee. She later took part in Tentacles, Games People Play, Sun-city and many other TV series.

Appiah remembers herself as being very shy the first time she went on set: "It was a Venus Film Production titled Divine Love and I had to play the role of Kate, the protagonist. I didn’t believe did too good. I fumbled but, many people did not notice it." Despite her nervousness, the first timer said she succeeded in impressing everyone.

Appiah says her best part was in Mummy’s Daughter by Venus Films. The film tells the story of the Bartels Family where she played the role of Princess, the daughter. "I loved how I acted and I was happy with the role I played". Appiah now sees the local film industry as having changed for the better. She thinks that others will see its ultimate success.

Nollywood breakthrough and success
Appiah was already known to Nollywood through her many successful Ghanaian films including Beyoncé - The President Daughter, Princess Tyra, Passion of the Soul, Pretty Queen, The Prince's Bride,
The King is Mine and The Perfect Picture. Her notable Nollywood films include Black Soul and Bitter Blessing, alongside Nollywood actor Ramsey Noah and My Last Wedding, alongside Nollywood actor Emeka Ike.

In 2013, she won the Best International Actress award at the Papyrus Magazine Screen Actors Awards (PAMSAA) 2013. which was held in Abuja, Nigeria.

Promotional work
Appiah's face can be seen on many billboards and TV commercials in Ghana including a GSMF advert on protection against HIV AIDSa. She won the face of U.B in a promotion she did for them on TV commercials and she is currently the face of IPMC for commercials and billboards. "GSMF " was her first TV commercial.

Awards and nominations

Filmography

Personal life
Jackie married Peter Agyemang in 2005 with whom she had one son, Damien. They divorced after three years of marriage.

References

External links 
 
 

1983 births
Living people
21st-century Ghanaian actresses
Actresses from Toronto
Best Actress Africa Movie Academy Award winners
Best Supporting Actress Africa Movie Academy Award winners
Canadian people of Ghanaian descent
Ghanaian film actresses